The 31st Los Angeles Film Critics Association Awards, given by the Los Angeles Film Critics Association, honored the best in film for 2005.

Winners

Best Picture:
Brokeback Mountain
Runner-up: A History of Violence
Best Director:
Ang Lee – Brokeback Mountain
Runner-up: David Cronenberg – A History of Violence
Best Actor:
Philip Seymour Hoffman – Capote
Runner-up: Heath Ledger – Brokeback Mountain
Best Actress:
Vera Farmiga – Down to the Bone
Runner-up: Judi Dench – Mrs Henderson Presents
Best Supporting Actor:
William Hurt – A History of Violence
Runner-up: Frank Langella – Good Night, and Good Luck.
Best Supporting Actress:
Catherine Keener – The 40-Year-Old Virgin, The Ballad of Jack and Rose, Capote, and The Interpreter
Runner-up: Amy Adams – Junebug
Best Screenplay (TIE):
Dan Futterman – Capote
Noah Baumbach – The Squid and the Whale
Best Cinematography:
Robert Elswit – Good Night, and Good Luck.
Runner-up: Christopher Doyle, Pung-Leung Kwan, and Lai Yiu-fai – 2046
Best Production Design:
William Chang – 2046
Runner-up: James D. Bissell – Good Night, and Good Luck.
Best Music Score:
Joe Hisaishi and Youmi Kimura – Howl's Moving Castle (Hauru no ugoku shiro)
Runner-up: Ryuichi Sakamoto – Tony Takitani
Best Foreign-Language Film:
Caché • France/Austria/Germany/Italy
Runner-up: 2046 • Hong Kong
Best Documentary/Non-Fiction Film:
Grizzly Man
Runner-up: Enron: The Smartest Guys in the Room
Best Animation:
Wallace & Gromit: The Curse of the Were-Rabbit
The Douglas Edwards Experimental/Independent Film/Video Award:
Peter Watkins – La Commune (Paris, 1871)
New Generation Award:
Terrence Howard
Career Achievement Award:
Richard Widmark
Special Citation:
Kevin Thomas for his contribution to film culture in Los Angeles.
David Shepard, Bruce Posner, and the Anthology Film Archives to honor Unseen Cinema, an unprecedented 8-disc collection of films from 1894 to 1941.

References

External links
 31st Annual Los Angeles Film Critics Association Awards

2005
Los Angeles Film Critics Association Awards
Los Angeles Film Critics Association Awards
Los Angeles Film Critics Association Awards
Los Angeles Film Critics Association Awards